Enuka Vanessa Okuma (born September 20, 1976) is a Canadian actress, best known for her role as detective Traci Nash in the Global/ABC police drama series, Rookie Blue (2010–2015). Okuma is also known for her work on the Canadian television series Madison (1994–1998) and Sue Thomas: F.B.Eye (2002–2005). She appeared in the first season of TV soap-opera Hillside as the scheming and conspiring Kelly.

Early life
Okuma was born in Vancouver, British Columbia. She is of Nigerian descent, from the Igbo people and is a graduate of Simon Fraser University's School for the Contemporary Arts.

Career

Early work: 1990s 
In 1990, she began her career on television, appearing as regular cast member during the first season of the teen soap opera, Hillside. Throughout the 1990s, she also played supporting roles in several made for television films and Canadian television series, such as Madison. She eventually made her feature film debut with a supporting role in Double Jeopardy (1999).

Transition from teen roles: 2000s–present 
Okuma co-starred in the American crime drama series Sue Thomas: F.B.Eye from 2002 to 2005. She guest starred on various hit television series, including Dark Angel, Odyssey 5, Cold Case, Grey's Anatomy and NCIS: Los Angeles.  She had the recurring role as Marika Donoso on the seventh season of the Fox series 24.

In 2010, Okuma began starring in the Global/ABC police drama series, Rookie Blue as detective Traci Nash. When being interviewed about how she got her role on Rookie Blue, Okuma said: I originally auditioned for the part of Gail [played by Charlotte Sullivan] and Charlotte auditioned for Traci. When we got the parts, I said, "I think I would rather play Traci" and Charlotte said, "I think I would rather play Gail." Thankfully, the producers thought the same.

Okuma was cast as one of lead characters in the ABC pilot, The Adversaries, in 2015. That year, she also guest starred as Nia Lahey on the hit series How to Get Away with Murder.

She joined the series Workin' Moms in 2021 as recurring character Sloane Mitchell and became a regular the following season.

Voice work
Okuma provided the voice of Lady Une in the English dub of Mobile Suit Gundam Wing, Jade on the Canadian animated series Shadow Raiders, and also voiced the gem fusion Rhodonite in Steven Universe. She provided the voice for the character Tau Idair in the game Star Wars: The Old Republic.

Writing and directing 
Okuma made her directorial debut with the short film, Cookie, on which she was also a writer, actor, and executive producer.

Okuma co-wrote the episode "Best Man" on Rookie Blue.

Awards
For her role in Madison, she was nominated for Best Performance in a Children's or Youth Program or Series at the 1995 Gemini awards. The following year, also for Madison, she was nominated for Best Performance by an Actress in a Continuing Leading Dramatic Role.

Okuma won a Women In Film award at the 1999 Vancouver International Film Festival for her role in Daydrift.

For her role on Rookie Blue, Okuma was nominated for Best Performance by an Actress in a Featured Supporting Role in a Dramatic Series at the 2011 Gemini awards and the Canadian Screen Award for Best Performance by an Actress in a Featured Supporting Role in a Dramatic Program or Series in 2013.

Personal life 
On July 2, 2011, she married musician Joe Gasparik in Toronto, the city where they first met while working on a television show together. Gasparik proposed to Okuma on a beach in Vancouver after three years of dating.

Filmography

Film

Television

References

External links
 

1976 births
Actresses from Vancouver
Black Canadian actresses
Canadian child actresses
Canadian film actresses
Canadian people of Nigerian descent
Canadian stage actresses
Canadian television actresses
Canadian voice actresses
Living people
Simon Fraser University alumni
20th-century Canadian actresses
21st-century Canadian actresses
Canadian people of Igbo descent
Igbo actresses